The posterior superior alveolar artery (posterior dental artery) is given off from the maxillary, frequently in conjunction with the infraorbital artery just as the trunk of the vessel is passing into the pterygopalatine fossa.

Branches
Descending upon the tuberosity of the maxilla, it divides into numerous branches, it descends on the posterior surface of the maxilla and gives branches that supply the molar and premolar teeth and the lining of the maxillary sinus, while others are continued forward on the alveolar process to supply the gingiva.

See also
 Anterior superior alveolar arteries
 Posterior superior alveolar nerve

Additional images

References

External links
 

Arteries of the head and neck